The Life and Adventures of Nicholas Nickleby (a.k.a. Nicholas Nickleby) is a British TV film which aired in 2001, directed by Stephen Whittaker, based on the 1839 novel Nicholas Nickleby by Charles Dickens.

Cast
James D'Arcy as Nicholas Nickleby
Sophia Myles as Kate Nickleby
Diana Kent as Mrs. Nickleby
Charles Dance as Ralph Nickleby
George Innes as Newman Noggs
Lee Ingleby as Smike
Donald Sumpter as Mr. Brooker
Gregor Fisher as Wackford Squeers
Pam Ferris as Mrs. Squeers
Debbie Chazen as Fanny Squeers
Chris Roebuck as Wackford Squeers Junior
Hannah Storey as Tilda Price 
Tom Ellis as John Browdie
Berwick Kaler as Mr. Snawley
Abigial McKern as Miss La Creevy
Tom Hollander as Alfred Mantalini
Marian McLoughlin as Madame Mantalini
Rosalind March as Miss Knag
Dominic West as Sir Mulberry Hawk 
Roderic Culver as Lord Verisopht
Malcolm Tierney as Vincent Crummles
Jacqueline Tong as Mrs. Crummles
Ruth Chapman as Ninetta Crummles, The "Infant Phenomenon"
Richard Katz as Mr. Lenville 
Jonathan Coy as Charles Cheeryble 
Simeon Andrews as Ned Cheeryble 
JJ Feild as Frank Cheeryble 
Frank Mills as Arthur Gride
Liz Smith as Peg Sliderskew
Katherine Holme as Madeleine Bray
Philip Bond as Mr. Walter Bray
Tom Hiddleston as Lord
 John Dallimore as Vicar

Awards
 Costume designer Barbara Kidd won a Royal Television Society Award in 2001, and a BAFTA in 2002 for her work on this film.

References

External links

Films based on Nicholas Nickleby
2001 television films
2001 films
Television shows based on works by Charles Dickens
Television series set in the 1830s
Films directed by Stephen Whittaker
2000s English-language films